Elvire Teza (born March 29, 1981) is a retired French gymnast who competed at the 1996 and 2000 Olympics. She was the French National Champion in gymnastics in 1997, 1999 and 2000.

Career
Born on the island of Reunion, Teza trained in Marseilles under coaches Shi Mao, Lin Xuan and Ma Jun. She made her international debut at the age of thirteen at the Junior European Championships, where she won bronze medals on the balance beam and floor exercise. At the 1996 Junior Europeans, she improved on these results, winning a gold medal on the uneven bars and silver medals with the French team and the beam final. In 1997, Teza became the first (and to date, the only) French gymnast to win the American Cup.

Teza competed at three World Gymnastics Championships, in 1995, 1997 (where she placed 6th on balance beam in event finals) and 1999. She also represented France at the Olympics twice; at the 1996 Games in Atlanta and the 2000 Games in Sydney. In Sydney, Teza became the first French female gymnast ever to qualify for an Olympic event final, placing eighth on the uneven bars.

Teza's beam and bars routines typically combined artistry with extreme difficulty. On the balance beam (coincidentally, an event she was said to dislike) Teza developed two original skills: a full twisting Yurchenko loop to back hip circle and a sideways Yang Bo jump. Both elements are named after her in the Code of Points and are classified as high-difficulty skills ( both are E level skills under the code of points in 2000, 2004, 2008, 2012 and 2016 periods). On the uneven bars she performed intricate work with German giant swings rarely seen in competition and two of those moves are named after her as well, which are the German giant variations of Pak salto and Bail to Handstand, both are D level skills under the code of points since 2000. Teza's tumbling and vaulting were considered relatively weak compared to her other events, however, on floor exercise she was known for presenting routines with expressive choreography and excellent dance elements.

Teza retired after the 2000 Olympics to pursue her education.

Eponymous skills
Teza has three eponymous skills listed in the Code of Points.

Competitive history

See also
Teza (gymnastics)

References

Sources
Teza(Skill on beam)
Biography and list of competitive results at the French Gymnastics Federation website (in French)
ABC-TV broadcast of the 1997 World Gymnastics Championships, 1997
Animation of teza performing her signature skill on beam
Animation of Teza performing a German giant on the uneven bars

1981 births
Living people
French female artistic gymnasts
Olympic gymnasts of France
Gymnasts at the 1996 Summer Olympics
Gymnasts at the 2000 Summer Olympics
Originators of elements in artistic gymnastics
21st-century French women